1996–97 Pirveli Liga was the 8th season of the Georgian Pirveli Liga.  The 1996–97 season was divided in two groups.

West Group

East Group

See also
1996–97 Umaglesi Liga
1996–97 Georgian Cup

References
RSSSF

Erovnuli Liga 2 seasons
2
Georgia